The Bour-Algi Giraffe Sanctuary is a community-based conservation and natural resource management initiative. The sanctuary is located in Garissa County, Kenya, in the area surrounding the village of Bour-Algi, 5 km south of Garissa town. The sanctuary covers an area of around 125 km² and borders the Tana River to the south-west. Its name stems from the large presence of giraffes attracted by the abundant acacia trees. Estimates state almost 1000 giraffes living in the outskirts of the Bour-Algi village.

History
In 1995, a group of volunteers from the Bour-Algi village initiated a self-help group to protect and preserve the wildlife present in the area. They embarked on various activities, including regular wildlife patrols and desnaring sweeps. As more and more villagers joined the conservation effort, the group’s action expanded to cover a broader area. In 2000, the local authorities of the Garissa District recognized the area as a giraffe sanctuary and began supporting the community’s activities. The Kenya Wildlife Service followed suit and appointed an Honorary Warden to support the initiative.

With support of Terra Nuova and the Arid Lands Resource Management Project (ALRMP), the community has been seeking formal status for its conservancy.

Wildlife
The most common herbivores in the sanctuary are giraffe and gerenuk. Other herbivores sighted in the area are Kirk's dik-dik, Lesser Kudu, warthog and waterbuck, albeit very rare.

Notes

References
 Githuru, M. et al. (2007) Wild Herbivores in Bour-Algi Giraffe Sanctuary, Kenya: Abundance, habitat use and interactions with humans. National Museums of Kenya.
 Antipa, R. S, Ali, M. H. and Hussein, A. A. (2007) Assessment of the Potential of Eco/Cultural Tourism as Viable Enterprises in Southern Garissa, Ijara and Lamu Districts: A Community Conservation and Enterprise Support Initiative. National Environmental Management Authority of Kenya.

External links
 Homepage of Terra Nuova
 Transboundary Environmental Project (TEP) by Terra Nuova
 Arid Lands Resource Management Project by the Office of the President of Kenya
 National Museums of Kenya
 National Environmental Management Authority of Kenya. 
 Kenya Wildlife Service

National parks of Kenya
Wildlife sanctuaries of Kenya
Garissa County